Big Bambú is also a work of art by the lettering artist, Walter Velez.

Big Bambú is the second album by Cheech & Chong, released in 1972.  The name Big Bambu is a reference to the actual Bambu brand of rolling paper. The original LP concept and album package was approved by the producer Lou Adler and designed by Craig Braun and manufactured by his company, Sound Packaging Corp. to look like a giant rolling paper package, and contained a giant rolling paper with the record. Vinyl copies with the rolling paper have become collectible and hard to find. The original CD packaging has been slightly reformatted, and does not contain rolling papers.

In generally positive review published in Rolling Stone, Janet Maslin singled out the duo's voice work for particular praise. "The thing Cheech and Chong are great with is voices. Each has terrific ears for dialect, anything from spare change wino to jiveass soul, and there are at least 20 distinct personae showing up here, all of them cleverly done."

The album was nominated for Best Comedy Recording at the 15th Grammy Awards, but lost to George Carlin's FM & AM.

Track listing

References 

1972 albums
Cheech & Chong albums
Ode Records albums
Warner Records albums
1970s comedy albums